Stephen Carroll was a Police Service of Northern Ireland (PSNI) officer who was killed by the Continuity IRA on 9 March 2009 in Craigavon, County Armagh, Northern Ireland. Carroll's killing marked the first time a serving police officer had been killed since the Good Friday Agreement in 1998.

Two days before the attack the Real IRA shot dead two British soldiers in Massereene, County Antrim. This period marked a significant escalation in the campaign by dissident republicans.

Attack
The Continuity IRA smashed a window with a brick knowing the PSNI would respond.

At about 9:45 pm two police vehicles arrived at the scene and when they went to get out they were shot at. A gunman shot Carroll from 50 metres away with an AK-47 while in his patrol car. Carroll was shot in the head.

Aftermath

The Continuity IRA claimed responsibility saying their North Armagh Battalion were responsible for the attack and that "As long as there is British involvement in Ireland, these attacks will continue."

On 10 March there was a one-minute silence in the Northern Ireland Assembly. Prime Minister Gordon Brown stated that "These are murderers who are trying to distort, disrupt and destroy a political process that is working for the people of Northern Ireland," Chief Constable Sir Hugh Orde called it a "sad day" and said the gunmen were "criminal psychopaths".

Richard Walsh, the spokesman for Republican Sinn Féin, a party linked to the Continuity IRA, said the killings were "an act of war" rather than murder. "We have always upheld the right of the Irish people to use any level of controlled and disciplined force to drive the British out of Ireland. We make no apology for that". He also described the PSNI as "an armed adjunct of the British Army".

Deputy First Minister of Northern Ireland Martin McGuinness said those responsible were "traitors to the island of Ireland" and that "they have betrayed the political desires, hopes and aspirations of all of the people who live on this island."

McConville and Wooton have become known as the ‘Craigavon 2’ amongst Irish Republicans who claim their innocence.

See also
Murder of Ronan Kerr
Murder of David Black

References 

2009 in Northern Ireland
Attacks by Republicans since the Good Friday Agreement
Continuity Irish Republican Army
Carroll, Stephen
History of County Armagh
March 2009 events in the United Kingdom
Terrorist incidents in the United Kingdom in 2009
2009 crimes in Ireland
Deaths by person in Northern Ireland
2000s murders in Northern Ireland
2009 murders in the United Kingdom